Novak Djokovic was the defending champion, but decided not to participate.
Andreas Seppi won the title defeating Benoît Paire 6–3, 6–2 in the final.

Seeds
The top four seeds receive a bye into the second round.

Draw

Finals

Top half

Bottom half

Qualifying

Seeds

Qualifiers

Draw

First qualifier

Second qualifier

Third qualifier

Fourth qualifier

References
Main Draw
Qualifying Draw

Serbia Open - Singles
Serbia Open